The 2016 NCAA Division III Men's Lacrosse Championship was the 37th annual single-elimination tournament to determine the national champion of NCAA Division III men's college lacrosse in the United States. The championship was played at Lincoln Financial Field in Philadelphia, Pennsylvania on May 29, 2016. All other rounds were played at campus sites, at the home field of the higher-seeded team, from May 11 to May 22.

Qualification
All Division III men's lacrosse programs were eligible for this championship. A total of 32 teams were invited, with programs receiving bids through one of three methods (or "Pools"). 
Pool A: Twenty-three (23) teams received automatic bids by winning their conference's post-season tournament

Pool B: Three (3) bids were awarded to three teams that either independents or are in conferences that do not sponsor post-season tournaments

Pool C: Six (6) at-large bids were to awarded to teams that did not win their conference's bid (tournament or non-tournament)

Bracket

Note: An asterisk marks the host team

See also
NCAA Division III Women's Lacrosse Championship
NCAA Division I Men's Lacrosse Championship
NCAA Division II Men's Lacrosse Championship

References

NCAA Division III Men's Lacrosse Championship
NCAA Division III Men's Lacrosse Championship
NCAA Division III Men's Lacrosse Championship
NCAA Division I Men's Lacrosse
Sports in Philadelphia